Alun Lawrence (born 15 September 1998) is a Welsh rugby union player who plays for Cardiff Blues as a back rower. He was a Wales under-20 international.

Lawrence made his debut for the Cardiff Blues regional team in 2019 having previously played for the Blues academy.

References

External links 
Cardiff Blues profile

1998 births
Living people
Cardiff Rugby players
Rugby union players from Pontypridd
Welsh rugby union players
Rugby union flankers
Rugby union number eights
Jersey Reds players